Dong-seok, also spelled Dong-suk or Tong-sok, is a Korean masculine given name. Its meaning depends on the hanja used to write each syllable of the name. There are 24 hanja with the reading "dong" and 20 hanja with the reading "seok" on the South Korean government's official list of hanja which may be used in given names.

People with this name include:
Dong-Suk Kang (born 1954), South Korean violinist
Kang Dong-suk (born 1969), South Korean yachtsman
Ma Dong-seok (born 1971), South Korean actor
Park Dong-suk (born 1984), South Korean football player
Kim Dong-suk (born 1987), South Korean football player

Fictional characters with this name include:
Kang Dong-seok, in 1995 South Korean television series Asphalt Man

See also
List of Korean given names

References

Korean masculine given names